Bicchoo Ka Khel is a Hindi-language crime thriller web series. Starring Divyendu Sharma in the lead, the series features Trishna Mukharjee, Anshul Chauhan, Mukul Chadda, Satyajit Sharma and Rajesh Sharma in key roles. It is a revenge drama that tells the tale of a young lad Akhil (Divyendu Sharma) from UP who challenges and mocks the legal system.

The series was released on November 18, 2020, and is available for streaming on both ZEE5 and ALT Balaji.

Plot 
The series revolves around mastermind killer Akhil who makes a confession in front of the police about why he committed a murder. He narrates the story about his life and challenges them that despite having confessed the crime to them, he would escape the legal system.

Cast 
 Divyendu Sharma as Akhil Srivastava
 Anshul Chauhan as Rashmi Chaubey   
 Mukul Chadda as Babu Shrivastav
 Trisshna Mukherji as Protima Chaubey 
 Zeishan Quadri  as Nikunj Tiwari
 Rajesh Sharma as Mukesh Chaubey
 Satyajit Sharma as Anil Chaubey 
 Gagan Anand as Rajveer

Release 
The series was released on November 18, 2020, and is available for streaming on both ZEE5 and ALT Balaji.

Reception 
Shubra Gupta from The Indian Express gave a mixed review stating "Divyenndu has a smart mouth on him, and makes the most of Bicchoo Ka Khel, but even he needs a new schtick." Archika Khurana from Times Of India gave 3 out of 5 stars and stated 
"Fans of Divyenndu Sharma aka Munna Bhaiya from Mirzapur will not be disheartened with his act as Akhil Shrivastav. He is back with a bang – mouthing dialogues laden with cuss words, his expressions and comic timing is just brilliant. Anshul Chauhan as his girlfriend Rashmi Chaubey has nailed it. Her chemistry with Divyenndu is endearing and turns out to be one of the highlights of the show." Gautam Batra from Koimoi wrote "Anshul Chauhan is too good. She lends a very good performance and looks so cute. Her chemistry with Divyenndu is endearing and one of the highlights of the show." Prathyush Parasuraman from Filmcompanion stated the moview as "It's a feel-good low-budget masala genre."

References

External links 
 
 Bicchoo Ka Khel on ZEE5
 Bicchoo Ka Khel on ALT Balaji

2020 web series debuts
Hindi-language web series